McIntyre, McEntire, MacIntyre, McAteer, and McIntire are Scottish and Irish surnames derived from the Gaelic  literally meaning "Son of the Craftsman or Mason", but more commonly cited as "son of the Carpenter." It is common in Ulster and the highlands of Scotland, found in Ireland mostly in counties Donegal, Londonderry, Tyrone and Sligo. A Uí Brolchainn Sept of the Uí Néill clan and a branch of the Cenel Eoghainn.

The surname McIntyre was first found in Argyllshire (Gaelic erra Ghaidheal), the region of western Scotland corresponding roughly with the ancient Kingdom of Dál Riata, in the Strathclyde region of Scotland, now part of the Council Area of Argyll and Bute, where according legend, Maurice or Murdock, The Wright, (c.1150) became the first MacIntyre chief as a reward for helping his uncle, Somerled, King of Argyll and the Western Isles. 
The Gaelic form of the name MacAntSaoir Anglicised into the various spellings noted. In the ancient Irish annals, the first abbot of Clonmacnoise Saint Ciarán (c. 516 – c. 549) Ciarán mac an tSaeir ("son of the carpenter"), appears to be the oldest known record of the name; was one of the Twelve Apostles of Ireland.

People
Notable people with the surname include:

 Archibald McIntyre (1772–1858), NY State Comptroller 1806–1821
 Archibald T. MacIntyre (1822–1900), US Representative from Georgia
 Arthur McIntyre (1918–2009), English Test cricketer
 Augustine McIntyre, Jr. (1876–1954), American brigadier general
 Carl McIntire
 Christine McIntyre
 David McIntyre (born 1987), Canadian professional ice hockey player
 Drew McIntyre (Drew Galloway) (born 1985), Scottish pro wrestler
 Donald McIntyre (born 1934), operatic bass-baritone from New Zealand
 Duncan MacIntyre (disambiguation), multiple people
 Eilidh McIntyre (born 1994), British sailor
 Frank McIntyre (1865–1944), American military officer
 Hope McIntyre, Canadian playwright and artistic director
 Hugh McIntyre (disambiguation), multiple people
 James McIntyre (disambiguation), multiple people
 Joey McIntyre (born 1972), New Kids on the Block member
 Jim McIntyre (footballer) (born 1972), Scottish football player and manager
 Joe McIntyre (footballer) (born 1971), footballer
 John Macintyre (1857–1928), Scottish radiologist
 Kevin McIntyre (disambiguation), multiple people
 Laurence McIntyre (1912–1981), Australian diplomat
 Margaret McIntyre (1886–1948), Tasmanian politician
 Mary McIntyre, Northern Irish photographer
 Mary McIntyre (artist) (born 1928), New Zealand artist
 Michael McIntyre (disambiguation), multiple people
 Michael McIntyre, English comedian
 Natalie McIntyre, American R&B and soul singer and actress
 Patrick McIntyre (1844–1898), New Zealand cricketer
 Paul McIntyre (scientist) (born 1987), American scientist
 Paul McIntyre (footballer), Scottish football player
 Paul McIntyre (politician), Canadian politician
Patience and Prudence McIntyre (professionally known as Patience & Prudence) (born 1942 and 1945 respectively), American sister singing duo
 Reba McEntire (born 1955), American country singer
 Samuel McIntire
 Steve McIntyre, primary author of the Climate Audit blog
 Taymor Travon McIntyre (born 2000),  American rapper known professionally as Tay-K
 Terence McIntyre (born 1930), first-class cricketer and Royal Air Force officer
 Terrell McIntyre (born 1977), basketball player
 Thongchai McIntyre (born 1958), Thai singer
 Tommy McIntyre (born 1963), Scottish football player
 Vonda N. McIntyre (1948–2019), American science fiction author
 William McIntyre (disambiguation), multiple people

Fiction works
 Tina McIntyre, character from Coronation Street
 Joe McIntyre, also in Coronation Street
 Harper McIntyre, character from The 100
 Luca McIntyre, character from Doctors
 Dr. 'Trapper John' McIntyre, character from M*A*S*H, the (TV Show, 1970 film, and book)

See also
 McIntyre v. Ohio Elections Commission, a U.S. Supreme Court case concerning the right to anonymous speech
 McIntire
 McEntire
 Clan MacIntyre

References

Scottish surnames
Anglicised Scottish Gaelic-language surnames
Patronymic surnames
Occupational surnames

fr:McIntyre